The Radio Rats was a South African rock group formed in 1977 in Springs, Gauteng, by Jonathan Handley (lead guitar and background vocals), Dave Davies on lead vocals and Herbie Parkin on bass, with various drummers. Leonard Dixon is remembered as the group's drummer during its most famous period. 

"The Rats", as they are known colloquially, are notable for their 1979 hit "ZX Dan". In 1978, the group recorded a ten-song LP called Into the Night We Slide. The album immediately created a stir, in particular with its kick-off single, "ZX Dan", which peaked at no. 2 on Johannesburg-based Radio 5 (now called "5FM"). It was kept off the number one position by Michael Jackson.

Critical reception
The South African Rock Lists website lists Into the Night We Slide as one of the top ten local rock albums of the seventies, along with Hawk’s African Day (1971), Freedom’s Children’s Astra (1970) and Rabbitt’s Boys Will Be Boys (1975). Into the Night We Slide has also been included in the "Essential South African albums" list, based on a survey of various people in the South African music industry compiled in 2002 by music critic, John Samson.

In his Radio Rats retrospective on SAFM radio in January 2000, Nigel Vermaas called Jonathan Handley one of the unsung heroes of South African music: "He's funny, he's witty and he's dedicated. And he's disarmingly self-deprecating."

History

The early years
The name "Radio Rats" first appeared on an A4 poster drawn and put up in August 1977 in Springs up by fifth-year Wits University medical student, Jonathan Handley. The band had in quick succession earlier that year called themselves "The Warehouse Rats", then "Slither", which briefly featured John Griffith — who as solo artist "John Ireland" would make his name with hits, "(You're) Living Inside my Head" in 1978 and "I Like" in 1982.

Dave Davies gave Parkin — also called David — the nickname "Herbie" because he didn't want a band with two men sporting the same name, and it stuck. Lloyd Ross of Shifty Records joined the Rats as a second guitarist and played on the 7-singles, "Crazy Caroline" and "Rocket Road", in 1979.

Cheryl van Blerk was the PRO for the Gramophone Record Company when she first heard the Radio Rats' demos, including an intriguing song titled "ZX Dan". When GRC ignored them, she recommended the band to her brother Patric, the owner of Jo'Burg Records and the legendary South African producer and composer. Jo'Burg Records was very active at the time following the success of artists like Rabbitt and Margaret Singana. Patric van Blerk, remembering that he loved the band from when he first heard them, described them in these terms: "Jonathan is a wizard and Dave Davies the greatest undiscovered rock leader singer in the world (alongside Brian Davidson [of Freedom's Children]) ! The whole album was oh-so right — and 'ZX Dan' just screamed 'hit'."

Cheryl van Blerk left GRC to become the Rats' manager.

The band cites among its influences John Cale ("not JJ Cale!"), David Bowie, Iggy Pop & the Stooges, the Rolling Stones, the Sex Pistols and the early Dr Feelgood. Despite this, during live performances they mostly played their own songs, which had all been written by Handley.

"ZX Dan"
In January/February 1979, "ZX Dan" peaked at number two on Johannesburg-based Radio 5. It is still cherished as one of South Africa's greatest pop rock songs of all time. At the end of 1999, it received the second-most votes in the "All time favourite SA song" category in "The SA Rock Digest/Amuzine End of the Century Big Vote". Bright Blue’s 1988 self-composition, "Weeping", took first spot. "Scatterlings of Africa" (1983) by Johnny Clegg and Juluka was third. 

In his liner notes for the 2002 CD release of Into the Night We Slide, Brian Currin wrote: "’ZX Dan’ is a wonderful piece of new wave space-rock whose similar lyrical theme is a nod to David Bowie’s 1972 hit, ‘Star Man’. The song was also inspired by the 1977 Steven Spielberg film Close Encounters of the Third Kind."

Into the Night We Slide
In Patric van Blerk's words, Into the Night We Slide is "a lovely adventure, which never caught fire mainstream, but has enjoyed the sort of passionate niche-loyalty that made a treasure out of [South African band] Freedom’s Children’s Astra. I always thought of it as the Jo’Burg Records equivalent to the other gems which took decades to go gold and platinum, such as Van Morrison’s Astral Weeks."

Reviewer Kurt Shoemaker of Texas, US, wrote in the SA Rock Digest e-mag on 27 November 1999: "I cannot think of any performers or groups to compare the Radio Rats to, so I'm left with the conclusion that in rock this is original stuff. Additionally, while possessing a distinctive style, each song is different from the others . . . This is fun and original and rollicking rock that doesn't lend itself to analogy."

Nonetheless, with the solitary exception of "ZX Dan", all tracks on the LP were banned from airplay by the South African Broadcasting Corporation because of their lyrical content.

The Rats recorded "Crazy Caroline" and "Rocket Road" at Satbel Studios in Johannesburg during June 1979 using Pierre de Sade (born Vos) on drums and Lloyd Ross on guitar. "Crazy Caroline" backed with the latter song was released as a single in July, but it failed to stir the charts.

The Radio Rats live in concert

Duncan Gibbon reviewed for Music Maker magazine a double-header concert of The Radio Rats and Wild Youth held at Travolta's at the Killarney Hotel in Durban in April 1979.

1980s and 1990s
Following their earlier success, 1980 was meant to be the year that the Radio Rats "made it big", but once again the group was plagued by renewed drummer problems following Leonard Dixon's departure. Although they never recaptured their former glory, the band's core of Jonathan Handley and Dave Davies continues until today. Over the years, Davies and Handley and various friends (sometimes including Jonathan's brother Graham) have released music under various guises — as the Radio Rats, the Pop Guns, the Chauffeurs, Titus Groan and the Glee Club.

Present

Jonathan Handley and Dave Davies still record and perform together. Handley is an anaesthetist practising in Pietermaritzburg and continues to record and archive in his home studio in Winterskloof. As an anaesthetist, he also oversees the training of future diplomate in anaesthetics. By September 2013, Jonathan Handley and his team of tutors at the hospital have trained more than 100 diplomate in anaesthetics. Davies still resides in the same house in Springs where he has always lived. Herbie Parkin is living, working, and playing in Sweden, most recently with Men on the Border, while Leonard Dixon has settled in Germany where he is still drumming.

2013's Cyanide Lake has reunited musically all four members that played on Into the Night We Slide, for the first time since the band's classic 1978 album.

Discography

Singles
"ZX-Dan"/"I’m in Love" (1979)
"Crazy Caroline"/"Rocket Road" (June 1979)
"Erase"/"Lisa Come Down" (April 1981)
"The Big Wham Bam"/"Welcome to My Car" (1981)

Albums
Into the Night We Slide (1978)
To the Tower (1981; 12 early Radio Rats compositions that were never released)
The Big Beat (1991)
Third Street (1995)
Theatre of Electric Chairs, aka Radio Rats IV (1995)
Tandy Park (1996)
Music for Funerals (2000)
Modern Cake Decorating (2001)
Home Decorating for Beginners (2003)
Entertaining from your Freezer (2005)
Locomotive Hotel (with Roger Lucey) (2005)
Spooky Obsession (2006)
Pop Coffins (2009)
Love Train (2010)
Madhouse (2011)
Radio Rats Live 1978 (2012)
Merry Tales (2013)
Cyanide Lake (2013)

Compilations
Pure Pop 1985-1988 (Radio Rats demos) (1988)
Girl Trouble (the Glee Club) (1999)
Girl Trouble 2 (the Radio Rats) (2009)
Girl Trouble 3 — Serious Trouble (the Glee Club, the Radio Rats and the Pop Guns) (2010)

References

External links
 
The South African Rock Files: The Radio Rats
The Radio Rats' family tree
Herbie Parkin's Radio Rats tribute website
Johannes Kerkorrel
James Phillips
Rodriguez

Musical groups established in 1977
South African rock music groups